Joseph Gillespie is an American football coach who currently serves as the defensive coordinator at Texas Christian University (TCU). He has previously served as the defensive coordinator for the University of Tulsa.

Coaching career 
Gillespie began his coaching career in 1995 as an assistant coach at his hometown Stephenville High School under head coach Art Briles. In 2008, he became the head coach of Stephenville where he led the team to a state championship in 2012. In 2016 he was hired as the linebackers coach at Tulsa, and was promoted to defensive coordinator in 2019. In 2022, he was hired by first year head coach Sonny Dykes to be the defensive coordinator of TCU. In his first season at TCU, Gillespie has been credited for turning around the Horned Frog's defense and helping lead the team to an 13-2 season. For his success in 2022, Gillespie was named a finalist for the Broyles Award.

References

External links 

TCU bio

Living people
TCU Horned Frogs football coaches
Tulsa Golden Hurricane football coaches
High school football coaches in Texas
Coaches of American football from Texas
1971 births